Are You Feeling Me  may refer to:

"Are You Feelin' Me", song by Aaliyah from Romeo Must Die
"Are You Feeling Me", song by Terry Dexter from Terry Dexter album